Amblyprora is a genus of moths of the family Noctuidae.

Species
Amblyprora acholi  (Bethune-Baker, 1906)
Amblyprora alboporphyrea  (Pagenstecher, 1907)
Amblyprora magnifica  (Schaus, 1893)
Amblyprora pacifica  (Bryk, 1915)
Amblyprora subalba  (Seydel, 1937)
Amblyprora superba  (Seydel, 1937)

References
Natural History Museum Lepidoptera genus database

Catocalinae
Noctuoidea genera